The Brokenhead River  is a river in eastern Manitoba. It flows north from its source in the Brokenhead Swamp within Sandilands Provincial Forest, to its mouth in Lake Winnipeg south of Stoney Point.

The Brokenhead is navigable by canoe for much of its length. Fishers based in the Brokenhead Ojibway Nation use the lower reaches of the river to access Lake Winnipeg.

Brokenhead River Ecological Reserve preserves  of river-bottom forest adjacent to the river in the Rural Municipality of Brokenhead.

Hazel Creek joins the Brokenhead as a right tributary several miles north of PTH 15. Bears Creek joins as a right tributary south of Mile 76 road N. Beaver Creek joins as a left tributary south of PR 435.

The river passes by the localities of:
Nourse
Lydiatt
St. Ouens|
Green Bay
Green Oak
Brokenhead
Dencross
Scanterbury

The river is bridged by:
Trans-Canada Highway
PTH 15
PTH 44
PR 435
PR 317
PTH 12
PTH 59

See also
List of Manitoba rivers

References

External links
 Brokenhead River, Manitoba
 Real-Time Hydrometric Data Graph for Brokenhead River near Beausejour (05SA002) [MB]

Rivers of Manitoba
Bodies of water of Eastman Region, Manitoba